Kaliachak is a town  in the Kaliachak I CD block in the Malda Sadar subdivision of Malda district in the Indian state of West Bengal. Kaliachak consists 4 Census Town  Silampur,Karari Chandpur,Baliadanga and Alipur

Kaliachak is one of the biggest commercial hub in Malda district as well as North Bengal  for Agriculture Business (Mango, Litchi, Silk and Jute) along with many  MSMEs (Polymer Recycling, Raw Plastic Factories,Readymade Garments ) and Hub of Private  Residential (Abasik) Schools.

Geography

Location
Kaliachak is located on the bank of the Pagla River.

Area overview
The area shown in the adjoining map is the physiographic sub-region known as the diara. It “is a relatively well-drained flat land formed by the fluvial deposition of newer alluvium.” Its most noteworthy feature is the Farakka Barrage across the Ganges. The area is a part of the Malda Sadar subdivision, which is an overwhelmingly rural region, but the area shown in the map has pockets of urbanization with 17 census towns, concentrated mostly in the Kaliachak I CD block. The bank of the Ganges between Bhutni and Panchanandapur (both the places are marked on the map), is the area worst hit  by left bank erosion, a major problem in the Malda area. The ruins of Gauda, capital of several empires, is located in this area.

Note: The map alongside presents some of the notable locations in the area. All places marked in the map are linked in the larger full screen map.

Civic administration

Police station
Kaliachak police station under West Bengal police has jurisdiction over Kaliachak I and Kaliachak II CD blocks.

CD block HQ
The headquarters of Kaliachak I CD block is at Kaliachak Town.

Demographics
According to the 2011 Census of India, Kaliachak had a total population of 15,200, of which 7447 (49%) were males and 7752 (51%) were females. Population in the age range 0–6 years was 3256. The total number of literate persons in Kaliachak was 9846 (64.91% of the population over six years).

Transport

Road
Kaliachak is on National Highway 12 (old number NH 34). and it is a big junction point for North Bengal to South Bengal.

Rail
There is a station at nearby Khaltipur railway station under Malda Town Division on the New Farakka-Old Malda section of Howrah-New Jalpaiguri line. The station has a double-electric line.  Howrah–Katihar Express and Howrah–Malda Town Intercity Express (via Azimganj) are important trains with stoppage.

Education
Kaliachak High School is a Bengali-medium coeducational institution established in 1938. It has facilities for teaching classes V to XII. It has a playground, a library with 4675 books and 10 computers for teaching and learning purposes.

Kaliachak Girls High School is a Bengali-medium girls only institution established in 1968. It has facilities for teaching classes V to XII. It has a library with 80 books and 15 computers for teaching and learning purposes.

There are many  residential schools with students from the states of West Bengal and Jharkhand. There are 26 residential boarding schools (English and Bengali medium) as per 2021.

Healthcare
Kaliachak (Silampur) Rural Hospital at  Kaliachak Town (with 30 beds) is the main medical facility in Kaliachak I CD Block. There are primary health centres at Sujapur (with 10 beds),  Jadupur (Naoda-Jadupur PHC) (with two beds) and Pirojpur (Narayanpur PHC) (with two beds).
There are three private nursing homes in a nearby town.

Fake currency hub 
The Kaliachak area of Malda district, located near the international border, witnessed massive riots in 2016. This area is considered to be providing a safe haven and passage to the mafia and anti-social elements. As per local sources, Kaliachak has become a hub of anti-social activities and crimes such as keeping illegal arms, cultivation of poppy, dealing in fake notes and illegal drug trafficking are rapidly growing in the region. The Reserve Bank of India (RBI) estimated in 2017 that about 70–80 per cent of all counterfeit notes seized in the country enter through the three India-Bangladesh border districts of Malda, Murshidabad and Nadia, all in West Bengal.

References

Villages in Malda district
Cities and towns in Malda district